Nelson Sebastián Maz Rosano (born 20 November 1984 in Durazno) is a Uruguayan former football striker.

Honours
Necaxa
Liga de Ascenso: Apertura 2009, Bicentenario 2010

León
Liga de Ascenso: Clausura 2012
Liga MX (1): Apertura 2013

External links

1984 births
Living people
People from Durazno Department
Uruguayan footballers
Uruguayan expatriate footballers
Association football forwards
Peñarol players
Central Español players
Montevideo Wanderers F.C. players
Dorados de Sinaloa footballers
Club Necaxa footballers
Indios de Ciudad Juárez footballers
C.D. Veracruz footballers
Club León footballers
Expatriate footballers in Mexico
Uruguayan Primera División players
Liga MX players
Uruguayan expatriate sportspeople in Mexico